Klea McKenna (born 1980) is an American visual artist. She is known for her camera-less photography, photograms and inventive techniques using light sensitive material. Her work is included in the collections of the San Francisco Museum of Modern Art, the Los Angeles County Museum of Art, the San Francisco airport, and the Victoria & Albert Museum, London.

Generation 
McKenna's body of work "Generation" Uses a printing press to imprint the texture of vintage textiles from women's fashion history into silver gelatin paper before exposing the embossed surface to light, creating a textural photogram. An LA Times review of a 2018 exhibition of this work notes that the textile used "...date from the 1890s to the 1960s and represent women’s wear from the U.S., India, Mexico, China and Europe."

References

1980 births
20th-century American women artists
21st-century American women artists
Living people